"Pod sretnom zvijezdom" (Under a lucky star) is a Croatian telenovela written by Diana Pečkaj Vuković. Main director is Branko Ivanda, while the other directors include Daniel Kušan, Mladen Dizdar, Aldo Tardozzi and Tomislav Rukavina. Telenovela started filming February 6, 2011. "PSZ" has started broadcasting on March 14, 2011 on Nova TV at 6 pm.

Plot 
Elizabeth "Betty" Vrban brings together her closest childhood friends for her 40th birthday celebration. Each woman expresses one wish during the blowing of birthday candles. The next day those wishes start to come true. Their lives start to change dramatically.

Music 
The title track "I remember only happy days" is a Croatian music classic, and a big 1980s hit sung by Gabi Novak. The authors of the song are Kemal Monteno and Arsen Dedić. For the purposes of telenovela, they recorded a special version of the song which was sung by a young Croatian singer Ivana Starčević.

Fun facts 
 This is the first telenovela of Diana Pečkaj Vuković which was broadcast on Nova TV. Former telenovelas by Diana were shown on HRT.
 Mirna Medaković, Sandra Lončarić, Ranko Zidarić, Zijad Gračić, Robert Kurbaša, Peter Ćiritović, Dean Krivačić, Barbara Nola, Nikša Marinović, Đorđe Kukuljica, Mario Valentić and Romina Vitasović have performed together in a successful Croatian telenovela "Dolina sunca".
 The first role of Serbian veteran actress Neda Arnerić in Croatian series.
 Although it was initially announced that the series will have 260 episodes, Nova TV cut the order to 75 episodes due to unsatisfactory ratings. The series ended with a cliffhanger.

Broadcasting 
Telenovela's world premiere was on March 13, 2011, on a Bosnian television channels RTRS and FTV, the day before the premiere in the country of origin. In Croatia the series started on March 14, 2011. Reruns of the telenovela were aired on Doma TV.

Cast

External links 
 

2011 telenovelas
2011 Croatian television series debuts
2011 Croatian television series endings
Croatian television soap operas
2010s Croatian television series
Nova TV (Croatia) original programming